Stacy Fork is an unincorporated community in Morgan County, Kentucky, United States. It lies along Route 191 south of the city of West Liberty, the county seat of Morgan County.  Its elevation is 823 feet (251 m).

The community's name is taken from the Stacy Fork, named after pioneer settler Meshack Shadrack Stacy
(1792–1870), who traveled through the Cumberland Gap from Tennessee and settled the area in the early 19th century.

References

Unincorporated communities in Morgan County, Kentucky
Unincorporated communities in Kentucky